Joshua Hurlburt-Yu (born 28 December 1994) is a Canadian badminton player. Joshua was a gold medalist in the mixed doubles event at the 2019 Lima Pan American Games, and also at the 2019 and 2021 Pan Am Championships.

Career
In June 2021, Hurlburt-Yu was named to Canada's Olympic team, competing in the mixed doubles badminton event.

Achievements

Pan American Games 
Mixed doubles

Pan Am Championships 
Mixed doubles

Pan Am Junior Championships 
Mixed doubles

BWF International Challenge/Series (9 titles, 2 runners-up) 
Men's doubles

Mixed doubles

  BWF International Challenge tournament
  BWF International Series tournament

References

External links 
 

1994 births
Living people
Sportspeople from Toronto
Canadian male badminton players
Badminton players at the 2020 Summer Olympics
Olympic badminton players of Canada
Badminton players at the 2019 Pan American Games
Pan American Games gold medalists for Canada
Pan American Games medalists in badminton
Medalists at the 2019 Pan American Games